Lea Zdunić (born 10 December 1998) is a Croatian footballer who plays as a defender for Prva HNLŽ club ŽNK Dinamo Zagreb and the Croatia women's national team.

References

External links

1998 births
Living people
Women's association football defenders
Croatian women's footballers
Croatia women's international footballers
Croatian Women's First Football League players
ŽNK Dinamo Zagreb players